Neşe Mercan (born September 19, 1994) is a Turkish female Paralympian goalball player. She is a member of the national team.

Early years
Neşe Mercan was born in İskenderun of Hatay Province, Turkey on September 19, 1994.

Sporting career
Mercan was a member of the women's national goalball team at the 2016 Paralympics in Rio de Janeiro, Brazil. She won the gold medal with her teammates at the Paralympics.

In 2018, she enjoyed her national team's silver medal win at the Goalball World Championships in Malmö, Sweden.

She was part of the national team, which became champion at the 2019 IBSA Goalball European Championship held in Rostock, Germany. Her team became undefeated champion at the 2019 Elite Teams International Women Goalball Tournament in Japan.

Honours

International
  2012 IBSA European Goalball Championships B in Ascoli Piceno, Italy
  2013 IBSA Goalball European Championship in Konya, Turkey
  2015 IBSA Goalball European Championship in Kaunas, Lithuania
  2016 Summer Paralympics in Rio de Janeiro, Brazil.
  2017 IBSA Goalball European Champişonship in Nastola, Finland
  2018 Goalball World Championships in Malmö, Sweden,
  2019 IBSA Goalball European Champişonship in Rostock, Germany,
  2019 Elite Teams International Women Goalball Tournament in Japan,

References

Living people
1994 births
People from İskenderun
Turkish sportswomen
Turkish blind people
Female goalball players
Turkish goalball players
Goalball players at the 2016 Summer Paralympics
Paralympic gold medalists for Turkey
Medalists at the 2016 Summer Paralympics
Paralympic medalists in goalball
Paralympic goalball players of Turkey
21st-century Turkish women
Sportspeople from Hatay